RRIICCEE is an American experimental band.

History
RRIICCEE was formed in 2007 by Gallo and Erlandson, and members have included Gallo (guitars, organ, bass, vocals), Erlandson (guitars, effects, drum machines), Corey Lee Granet (guitar, bass), Rebecca Casabian (keyboards), Simon Haas (drums), and Nikolas Haas (drums, tambourine). Guitarist Corey Lee Granet (formerly of the Los Angeles based band The Warlocks) was in the band until their appearance at Japan's Fuji Rock Festival in 2007, and Rebecca Casabian and Nikolas Haas joined shortly after his departure. Casabian and Erlandson were in the band until the end of the 2007 RRIICCEE tour of the United States, at which time Simon Haas - Nikolas Haas' brother - joined the group.

References

External links
Official RRIICCEE website
RRIICCEE Band site on Myspace
RRIICCEE forum
Official Vincent Gallo website

American experimental musical groups